Józef Kępiński (19 June 1917 w Ruszkowo – 7 August 1981 in Szczecin) was a Polish engineer, chemist and university professor. A graduate of the Warsaw University of Technology, he specialised in chemical engineering and process engineering. Between 1965 and 1975 he was the rector of the Szczecin University of Technology. Kępiński was also a member of the Polish Chemical Society, the Polish Academy of Sciences and Polish Federation of Engineering Associations.

References 

Polish chemical engineers
1917 births
1981 deaths
Warsaw University of Technology alumni
Academic staff of the Szczecin University of Technology